EFX was a musical album released of David Cassidy's version of the Las Vegas show, EFX.  The album was released in 1997 and only made available on compact disc through the MGM Grand.  Cassidy was the headline performer for EFX for two years.

During his tenure as a headliner of EFX, Cassidy wrote and recorded the song, Intergalactic Circus of Wonder.

Track listing
Master's Theme 
EFX 
The Magic That Surrounds You 
Intergalactic Circus of Wonder (David Cassidy) 
The Greatest Showman in the Universe 
The Jig 
Tonight 
River in Time 
Stick Dance 
Break-out 
Finale Dance- the BIG beat 
Let It Shine - Part I 
Let It Shine - Part

References

David Cassidy albums